Good Morning, Boys! is a 1937 British comedy film directed by Marcel Varnel and featuring Will Hay, Graham Moffatt, Martita Hunt, Lilli Palmer and Peter Gawthorne. It was made at the Gainsborough Studios in Islington.

The film marked the first appearance of both Peter Gawthorne and Charles Hawtrey in a Will Hay film, both of whom would go onto act as straight men to Hay in his future films.

Plot
Will Hay plays the roguish headmaster, Dr Twist, of a dubious boarding school for boys. Twist bets on the horses with his pupils and teaches them little. Colonel Willoughby-Gore attempts to sack the incompetent Twist but is foiled when he and his boys, after fraudulently gaining resounding success in a French examination, are invited to Paris by the French ministry of education.

In Paris they become involved with a gang of criminals, including escaped convict Arty Jones, father of one of the boys, and Yvette, a night club singer, who are attempting to steal the Mona Lisa from the Louvre and replace it with a duplicate.

Cast
Will Hay as Dr Benjamin Twist
Martita Hunt as Lady Bagshott
Peter Gawthorne as  Col. Willoughby-Gore
Graham Moffatt as Albert Brown
Fewlass Llewellyn as The Dean
Mark Daly as  Arty Jones
Peter Godfrey as Cliquot
C. Denier Warren as Minister of Education
Lilli Palmer as Yvette
Charles Hawtrey as  Septimus
George Ravenscroft as one of the boys

Critical reception
Allmovie wrote, "the magnificent Will Hay re-creates his vaudeville characterization of a supercilious schoolmaster...But the inimitable, toothless Moore Marriott (aka "Harbottle") is conspicuous by his absence."

References

Bibliography
 Low, Rachael. Filmmaking in 1930s Britain. George Allen & Unwin, 1985.
 Wood, Linda. British Films, 1927-1939. British Film Institute, 1986.

External links
 

1937 films
1930s crime comedy films
British black-and-white films
1930s English-language films
British crime comedy films
Films about educators
Films set in schools
Films set in England
Films set in London
Films set in Paris
Islington Studios films
Gainsborough Pictures films
Films directed by Marcel Varnel
Films with screenplays by Marriott Edgar
Films scored by Jack Beaver
1937 comedy films
1930s British films